"151 Rum" is a song by American rapper JID, released on September 19, 2018 as the lead single from his second studio album, DiCaprio 2. It was produced by Nice Rec and Christo.

Critical reception
Kevin Goddard of HotNewHipHop called the song a "lyrical onslaught".

Charles Holmes of Rolling Stone said "J.I.D.'s flow is the crowning achievement of '151 Rum'. Nimble, sparse and blunt, every word serves the song's plot. It's hard to make a chorus that contains a tongue twister like, '151 rum and a blunt, young nigga numb, numb, numb and he got a little gun / A little bitty killer really doin' it for fun, give him a little bit and he'll get a nigga done' work musically and technically. But the rapid flow, haunting chants and J.I.D's bars transform the song into the audio equivalent of running for one's life".

Music video 
The music video for "151 Rum" premiered on May 1, 2019. It was directed by Scott Lazer, and features a cameo from his producer DJ Christo. In the video's plot, J.I.D is kidnapped and forced to perform. Complex called the video "dark and intense".

Certifications

References 

2018 singles
2018 songs
Interscope Records singles
JID songs
Songs written by JID